Zamarada metallicata is a moth of the family Geometridae first described by William Warren in 1914.

Distribution
It is known from Botswana, Namibia, South Africa and Zimbabwe.

Biology
A known food plant of the larvae is Acacia karroo (Fabaceae).

References
 Warren, 1914. Descriptions of new species of Lepidoptera Heterocera in the South African Museum. Annals of the South African Museum 10(12):467–510, pls. 40–41.

External links
 With images.

Ennominae